"(Are You) The One That I've Been Waiting For?" is the second single from the album The Boatman's Call by Nick Cave and the Bad Seeds. The single, released on May 19, 1997, was pressed on 7" and 12" vinyl, as well as a standard CD single, though the song failed to chart anywhere except the U.K., where it only made it to #67. A promotional music video for the song was also recorded.

Background and history
The song, like many on The Boatman's Call, seems to reflect on Nick Cave's personal relationships and spiritual yearnings at the time of writing. This song in particular is widely speculated to either be a love song or directed at either the mother of Cave's son Luke, Viviane Carneiro, or PJ Harvey, with whom Cave had a brief relationship prior to the album's recording and release.

A line from the song that states, "there's a man who spoke wonders / I've never met him / he said, 'he who seeks finds and who knocks will be let in'", which is an indirect quotation of Matthew 7:8 from The Bible.

Track listing
UK and Australian CD single (Liberation Records, D1626)
"(Are You) The One That I've Been Waiting For?" – 4:06
"Come Into My Sleep" – 3:48
"Black Hair" (band version) – 4:14
"Babe, I Got You Bad" – 3:49

UK 7" single (Mute Records, MUTE 206)
"(Are You) The One That I've Been Waiting For?" – 4:06
"Come Into My Sleep" – 3:48

Music video
Before the single's release, a promotional music video for the song was recorded. The video features the band performing the song in a small church hall.

Cover versions 
A version in Swedish, (Är du) den som jag har väntat på? appears on album Vid Grinden by Georga.

References

Nick Cave songs
Songs written by Nick Cave
1997 songs
Mute Records singles